Open Letter Books is an American publishing house based at the University of Rochester in Rochester, New York. It was founded in 2008 by Chad W. Post, the former associate director of Dalkey Archive Press. It specializes in translation, a less-populated field in American publishing.

Publications
Open Letter is a literary press that publishes ten books annually—mostly novels and short stories, and one book of poetry. The press also runs Three Percent, an extensive online resource for literature in translation, which presents the yearly Best Translated Book Award. The press has received funding perennially from the National Endowment for the Arts, as well as from the University of Rochester, New York State Council on the Arts, Amazon.com, and a variety of international foundations and individuals. At present, they have published around a hundred books from over twenty different languages.

Past publications include the works of Marguerite Duras, Can Xue, Rodrigo Fresán, Sara Mesa, Bae Suah, Kristín Ómarsdóttir, and Bragi Ólafsson.

Premises and personnel
The Press is affiliated with the Literary Translation Studies program at the University of Rochester. Its current editors are Chad W. Post, Kaija Straumanis, and Anastasia Nikolis (poetry). Decisions on publication are made jointly by Open Letter's editorial board and executive committee and manuscripts are acquired both through open submission and solicitation.

References

External links

Three Percent at the University of Rochester
Interview with Chad W. Post

Book publishing companies based in New York (state) 
Publishing companies established in 2008 
Poetry organizations 
2008 establishments in New York (state)